Wolfpen, in Mallie, Kentucky, is a historic site which was listed on the National Register of Historic Places in 2014.

It is the log house which became a retreat of author James Still, author of The Wolfpen Notebooks.

References

Log houses in the United States
Houses on the National Register of Historic Places in Kentucky
National Register of Historic Places in Knott County, Kentucky